Valantinas is a  family name.  

It may refer to:
Algimantas Valantinas (born 1961), Lithuanian judge
Rytis Valantinas, Lithuanian artist, the designer of the 200-litas banknote
Indrė Valantinaitė (born 1984), Lithuanian poet
 

Lithuanian-language surnames